"Gone Too Soon" is a song recorded by English singer Shakila Karim. It was released on 24 October 2011.

Background and composition
"Gone Too Soon" is the second single by Shakila Karim. The song was written by Karim's father, Karim Ullah, and is a tribute to singers who have died young, including Amy Winehouse, Michael Jackson, Freddie Mercury, John Lennon, Elvis Presley, Jimi Hendrix, Billie Holiday and Kurt Cobain.

References

External links

2011 singles
2011 songs
British pop songs
List songs
Shakila Karim songs